Moreno Hofland (born 31 August 1991) is a Dutch former professional road bicycle racer, who rode professionally between 2010 and 2021 for the , ,  and  teams.

Career
In 2014 he took a stage win in Paris–Nice. In May 2015, Hofland gave his  team its first victory of the season by winning a bunch sprint on the second stage of the Tour de Yorkshire, taking off some pressure on the organization by media outlets. That season he also won a stage of the Ster ZLM Toer. He then joined  in 2017, staying with the team for two seasons and winning the Famenne Ardenne Classic in his first season with the Belgian squad. Hofland then joined  in 2019. After only starting three races in 2021, he announced his retirement from competition in September of that year, disclosing that he had been suffering from intestinal ischemia, which had disrupted his ability to train and race.

Major results

2010
 7th Overall Thüringen Rundfahrt der U23
2011
 1st Stage 1 Tour de l'Avenir
 1st Stage 3 (TTT) Vuelta Ciclista a León
 2nd Overall Kreiz Breizh Elites
1st Stages 2 & 4
 2nd Dorpenomloop Rucphen
 8th Grand Prix de la Somme
2012
 1st  Road race, National Under-23 Road Championships
 1st Stage 2 Tour de l'Avenir
 1st Stage 1 (TTT) Thüringen Rundfahrt der U23
 2nd Ster van Zwolle
 4th Münsterland Giro
 5th Overall Kreiz Breizh Elites
1st Stage 4
 6th Paris–Roubaix Espoirs
 7th Grand Prix Pino Cerami
 10th Val d'Ille Classic
2013
 1st  Overall Tour of Hainan
1st  Points classification
1st Stages 1, 6 & 8
 8th Münsterland Giro
 10th Grand Prix Impanis-Van Petegem
2014
 1st Volta Limburg Classic
 1st Stage 2 Paris–Nice
 1st Stage 4 Vuelta a Andalucía
 1st Stage 1 Tour of Hainan
 Tour of Utah
1st Stages 1 & 3
 2nd Kuurne–Brussels–Kuurne
 6th Münsterland Giro
2015
 1st Stage 2 Tour de Yorkshire
 3rd Overall Ster ZLM Toer
1st Stage 3
 9th RideLondon–Surrey Classic
2016
 3rd Nationale Sluitingsprijs
2017
 1st Famenne Ardenne Classic
 3rd  Road race, UEC European Road Championships
 3rd Arnhem–Veenendaal Classic
 4th Tacx Pro Classic
2018
 8th Great War Remembrance Race
 9th Handzame Classic
2019
 2nd Road race, National Road Championships

Grand Tour general classification results timeline

References

External links

Dutch male cyclists
1991 births
Living people
Sportspeople from Roosendaal
UCI Road World Championships cyclists for the Netherlands
Cyclists from North Brabant